"You Can Feel Bad" is a song written by Matraca Berg and Tim Krekel, and recorded by American country music artist Patty Loveless.  It was released in December 1995 as the first single from her eight album, The Trouble with the Truth (1996). The song charted for 20 weeks on the Billboard Hot Country Singles and Tracks chart, reaching No. 1 during the week of March 23, 1996.

Critical reception
Wendy Newcomer from Cash Box wrote, "Loveless’ new single from her upcoming album Trouble With The Truth is delivered with the elan of a great interpreter—loose, soulful and confident. Loveless is an artist who consistently records well-written songs with just the right amount of feisty attitude."

Charts

Weekly charts

Year-end charts

References

1995 singles
Patty Loveless songs
Songs written by Matraca Berg
Song recordings produced by Emory Gordy Jr.
Epic Records singles
Songs written by Tim Krekel
1995 songs